is a national park in the Kantō region, on the main island of Honshū in Japan.  The park spreads over three prefectures: Tochigi, Gunma and Fukushima, and was established in 1934.

History

The establishment of Nikkō National Park dates to the early 20th century. The National Parks Law was passed in 1931, and Nikkō National Park was established in 1934. The park was expanded throughout the 20th century. Oze National Park was once part of Nikkō National Park, but became a separate national park in 2007.

Description

The park is considered one of the most beautiful in Japan, and is a popular tourist destination. Beyond its striking scenery, the park is noted for its historical Buddhist temples and Shinto shrines, most notably the Nikkō Tōshō-gū and Rinnō-ji. They are designated a UNESCO World Heritage Site as the "Shrines and Temples of Nikkō".

The park is free entry and is divided into three zones, such as Nikko, Kinugawa/Kuriyama, Nasu Kashi/Shiobara.

Notable places
 Nikkō Tōshō-gū, a Shinto shrine, Nikkō, Tochigi Prefecture
 Lake Chūzenji, a scenic lake, Nikkō
 Kegon Falls, one of Japan's three highest waterfalls
 Mount Nantai, rises dramatically above Lake Chūzenji
 Mount Nikkō-Shirane, a shield volcano
 Rinnō-ji, a Buddhist temple, Nikkō
 Ryūzu Falls, a scenic twin waterfalls
 Sessho-seki, a "killing stone" that fractured in 2022

Flora
Nikkō National Park is noted for numerous species of plants and trees, including mizu-bashō, the white skunk cabbage of the Ozegahara marshland, maples, firs, and magnificent stands of sugi, the Japanese cedar that line the roads around Nikkō.

Recreation
Nikkō National Park is a popular destination for hiking, skiing, camping, golfing, and its numerous historical onsen hot spring resorts.

See also
List of national parks of Japan

References

External links

 Japan Ministry of the Environment: Nikko National Park
 日光国立公園

National parks of Japan
Parks and gardens in Fukushima Prefecture
Parks and gardens in Gunma Prefecture
Parks and gardens in Tochigi Prefecture
1934 establishments in Japan
Protected areas established in 1934